Alberto Bagnai (born 10 December 1962) is an Italian politician and economist.

Biography
Bagnai was born in 1962 in Florence. After moving to Rome in 1971, he studied economy at the Department of Public Economics of the University of Rome "La Sapienza". He graduated in economics and commerce, at the age of 27, in 1989 with an econometrics thesis on "Procedures for the estimation and verification of econometric hypotheses"; he then discussed a PhD thesis in Economics in 1994 with a dissertation on "Sustainability and dynamic pathways of public debt in Italy".

In 2005 he became associate professor of economic policy at the Faculty of Economics of the "Gabriele d'Annunzio" University of Chieti and Pescara. Since 2012 he is associate researcher at CREAM at the University of Rouen in France and since 2013 he has been a member of the board of the International Network for Economic Research. In the same year he formed the Italian Association for the Study of Economic Asymmetries, which he currently chairs.

In 2012 he published the successful book "Il tramonto dell'euro" (The decline of the euro). With a strongly Eurosceptic and anti-globalist orientation, Bagnai calls himself a post-Keynesian economist and adheres to the orthodox vision expressed by economists such as James Meade, Anthony Thirlwall and Martin Feldstein, according to which there are no structural assumptions for Europe to equip itself of a single currency. Bagnai also defines himself as a left-wing populist.

In 2014 published another successful book "L'Italia può farcela" ("Italy can do it"). In the general election of 2018 he was elected Senator among the ranks of the League and in 2020 is nominated by the League's secretary Matteo Salvini, the economic and finance responsable of the party.

References

1962 births
Living people
21st-century Italian politicians
Lega Nord politicians
Politicians from Florence
20th-century Italian people